The 2015 William Hill World Darts Championship was the 22nd World Championship organised by the Professional Darts Corporation since it separated from the British Darts Organisation. The event was held at the Alexandra Palace, London between 18 December 2014 and 4 January 2015.

Michael van Gerwen was the defending champion, having won his first World Championship title in 2014, but he lost 6–3 to Gary Anderson in the semi-finals. Anderson won the title by beating 16-time World Champion Phil Taylor 7–6 in the final. Taylor became the first player in PDC World Championship history to reach the PDC World Champsionship final, achieve a tournament 3-dart average of over 100, and yet not win the title.

Adrian Lewis threw the event's only nine-dart finish in his third round match with Raymond van Barneveld. John Michael and Boris Koltsov became the first players from Greece and Russia respectively to play in the first round of a PDC World Championship. Cristo Reyes became the first Spanish player to reach the last 16 in the history of the event.

Format and qualifiers
The tournament featured 72 players. The top 32 players on the PDC Order of Merit on 2 December 2014 (after the Players Championship Finals) were seeded for the tournament. They were joined by the 16 highest non-qualified players from the Pro Tour Order of Merit, based on the events played on the 2014 PDC Pro Tour.

These 48 players were joined by two PDPA qualifiers (as determined at a PDPA Qualifying event held in Coventry on 1 December 2014), the highest ranked non-qualified player on the PDC Challenge Tour Order of Merit, and 21 international players: the four highest names on the European Order of Merit not already qualified, and 17 further international qualifiers determined by the PDC and PDPA. Some of the international players, such as the four from the European Order of Merit, and the top American and Australian players were entered straight into the first round, while others, having won qualifying events in their countries, were entered into the preliminary round.

The field was set on 1 December 2014. John Michael became the first Greek player to play in the PDC World Championship.

Qualifiers

Order of Merit

Pro Tour
  Andrew Gilding
  Darren Webster
  Benito van de Pas
  Christian Kist
  Jamie Lewis
  Ronny Huybrechts
  Wayne Jones
  Gerwyn Price
  John Henderson
  Keegan Brown
  David Pallett
  Joe Cullen
  Kyle Anderson
  Jyhan Artut
  Mickey Mansell
 

European Order of MeritFirst round qualifiers
  Mensur Suljović
 
  Max Hopp
  Ryan de Vreede

PDPA QualifierFirst round qualifier
  Jason Hogg

Preliminary round qualifier
  Scott MacKenzie

International QualifiersFirst round qualifiers
  Dave Richardson
  Laurence Ryder
  John Weber
Preliminary round qualifiers
  Nolan Arendse
  Daryl Gurney
  Jani Haavisto
  Alex Hon
  Scott Kirchner
  Boris Koltsov
  Robert Marijanović
  Mark McGrath
  John Michael
  Haruki Muramatsu
  Ian Perez
  Cristo Reyes
  Sascha Stein
  Kim Viljanen
 

1 Jarkko Komula, who finished second in the Scandinavian Order of Merit, was ineligible to play due to a suspension from the Finnish Darts Organisation. Kim Viljanen, who finished third, therefore replaced Komula.

2 Ryan de Vreede qualified after Richie Burnett was removed from the field due to personal reasons. As a result, Stuart Kellett moved into the top 32 seeds and Rowby-John Rodriguez qualified through the Pro Tour instead of the European Tour.

Prize money
The 2015 World Championship featured a prize fund of at least £1,250,000 - an increase of £200,000 from the 2014 tournament.

The prize money is allocated as follows:

Results

Preliminary round
The preliminary round was played in a first to four legs format. One match was played per session with the winners playing their first round matches later on the same day. The draw was held on 30 November 2014, two days before the main draw. Gurney achieved the highest average in the history of the Preliminary round.

Exhibition
The event also included a single-leg exhibition between two England cricket teammates – fast bowler James Anderson and opening batsman and Test captain Alastair Cook.

Last 64

Final

Statistics

Representation from different countries
This table shows the number of players by country in the World Championship, the total number including the preliminary round.

Broadcasting

The tournament was available in the following countries on these channels:

† Sky Sports 3 was renamed as Sky Sports Darts for the duration of the tournament. The channel's coverage of the event was later named the Best Sports of Live Event Coverage at the Broadcast Digital Awards.

References

External links
Official site
PDC Netzone - Results, schedule

2015
World Championship
World Championship
2014 sports events in London
2015 sports events in London
2014 in British sport
2015 in British sport
December 2014 sports events in the United Kingdom
January 2015 sports events in the United Kingdom
International sports competitions in London
Alexandra Palace